Manuel Piñero (20 August 1920 – 20 February 1969) was a Chilean footballer. He played in six matches for the Chile national football team in 1945. He was also part of Chile's squad for the 1945 South American Championship.

References

External links
 

1920 births
1969 deaths
Chilean footballers
Chile international footballers
Place of birth missing
Association football midfielders
Audax Italiano footballers